Botryococcene synthase (SSL-3 (gene)) is an enzyme with systematic name C30 botryococcene:NADP+ oxidoreductase. This enzyme catalyses the following chemical reaction

 C30 botryococcene + NADP+ + diphosphate  presqualene diphosphate + NADPH + H+

This enzyme is isolated from the green alga Botryococcus braunii BOT22.

References

External links 
 

EC 1.3.1